The Catholic Archdiocese of Gwangju (Hangul: 천주교 광주대교구) is a particular church of the Latin Church of the Catholic Church, one of the three Metropolitan sees of the Catholic Church in Korea.  The Archdiocese covers the city of Gwangju and entire South Jeolla Province.

History
On 13 April 1937 Pope Pius XI established the Prefecture Apostolic of Kwoszu.  Pope Pius XII changed its name to the Prefecture Apostolic of Kwangju on 12 July 1950.  It was elevated to a Vicariate Apostolic on 21 January 1957.  Pope John XXIII elevated the vicariate to an archdiocese on 10 March 1962.

Leadership

Ordinaries

Apostolic Prefects of Kwangju
Owen McPolin (1937–1942)
Thomas Asagoro Wakida (1942–1945)
Owen McPolin (1945–1947)
Patrick Thomas Brennan (1949–1950)
Harold William Henry (1954–1957)

Apostolic Vicars of Kwangju
Harold William Henry (1957–1962)

Archbishops of Gwangju
Harold William Henry (1962–1971), appointed Apostolic Administrator of Cheju
Peter Han Kong-ryel (1971–1973)
Victorinus Youn Kong-hi (1973–2000)
Andreas Choi Chang-mou (2000–2010)
Hyginus Kim Hee-jong (2010–2022)
Simon Ok Hyun-jin (2022–present)

Coadjutor Archbishops
Andreas Choi Chang-mou (1999–2000)
Hyginus Kim Hee-jong (2009–2010)

Auxiliary Bishops
Andreas Choi Chang-mou (1994–1999)
Hyginus Kim Hee-jong (2003–2009)
Simon Ok Hyun-jin (2011–2022)

References

External links
Archdiocese of Gwangju

Roman Catholic Archdiocese
Gwangju
Christian organizations established in 1937
Gwangju
1937 establishments in Korea
 
A